Svenska dansbandsmästerskapen (meaning Swedish Dansband Championships) is an annual music competition event for dansbands (dance bands) in Sweden. It was held between 1991 and 2003 when it was suspended. Dansbands were chosen by public vote after local elimination events prior to the final.

Winners
(locations in parenthesis)
1991: Carina Jaarneks (Ronneby
1992: Grönwalls (Hässleholm)
1993: Fernandoz (Torsby)
1994: Mats Bergmans (Nyköping)
1995: Martinez (Sundsvall)
1996: Boogart (Malå)
1997: Joyride (Stockholm)
1998: Casanovas (Vadstena)
1999: Sound Express (Mariestad)
2000: Expanders (Boden)
2001: Hjältarna (Södertälje)
2002: Zlips (Östersund)
2003: Gamblers (Mariestad)

Music competitions in Sweden
Recurring events established in 1991
Annual events in Sweden
1991 establishments in Sweden